The emphasis of the treatment of bipolar disorder is on effective management of the long-term course of the illness, which can involve treatment of emergent symptoms. Treatment methods include pharmacological and psychological techniques.

Bipolar Disorder is a serious and debilitating mental health disorder, which causes patients to experience extreme highs and lows, such as mania and major depression. Bipolar disorder is often stigmatized as causing "crazy" behaviors, and physically alters the brain. This disorder affects the brain in many different ways such as, in the prefrontal cortex, which plays a big role in planning, attention, problem-solving, and memory, along with the hippocampus, which is essential for storing memories. It has been proven that patients with bipolar disorder have less total brain volume, grey and white matter, and more cerebral spinal fluid.

Principles 
The primary treatment for bipolar disorder consists of medications called mood stabilizers, which are used to prevent or control episodes of mania or depression. Medications from several classes have mood stabilizing activity. Many individuals may require a combination of medication to achieve full remission of symptoms. As it is impossible to predict which medication will work best for a particular individual, it may take some trial and error to find the best medication or combination for a specific patient. Psychotherapy also has a role in the treatment of bipolar disorder. The goal of treatment is not to cure the disorder but rather to control the symptoms and the course of the disorder. Generally speaking, maintenance treatment of bipolar disorder continues long after symptom control has been achieved.

Following diagnostic evaluation, the treating clinician must determine the optimal treatment setting in order to ensure the patient's safety. Assessment of suicide risk is key, as the rate of suicide completion among those with bipolar disorder may be as high as 10–15%. Hospitalization should be considered in patients whose judgment is significantly impaired by their illness, and those who have not responded to outpatient treatment; this may need to be done on an involuntary basis. Treatment setting should regularly be re-evaluated to ensure that it is optimal for the patient's needs.

Legend:

- negligible/very low/clinically insignificant effect

+ weak effect

++ moderate-level effect

+++ strong effect

Regulatory status of mood stabilisers

Mood stabilizers

Lithium salts 

Lithium salts have been used for centuries as a first-line treatment for bipolar disorder. In ancient times, doctors would send their mentally ill patients to drink from "alkali springs" as a treatment. Although they were not aware of it, they were actually prescribing lithium, which was present in high concentration within the waters. The therapeutic effect of lithium salts appears to be entirely due to the lithium ion, Li+.

Its exact mechanism of action is uncertain, although there are several possibilities such as inhibition of inositol monophosphatase, modulation of G proteins or regulation of gene expression for growth factors and neuronal plasticity. There is strong evidence for its effectiveness in acute treatment and prevention of recurrence of mania.  It can also be effective in bipolar depression, although the evidence is not as strong. It is also effective in reducing the risk of suicide in patients with mood disorders.

Potential side effects from lithium include gastrointestinal upset, tremor, sedation, excessive thirst, frequent urination, cognitive problems, impaired motor coordination, hair loss, and acne. Excessive levels of lithium can be harmful to the kidneys, and increase the risk of side effects in general. As a result, kidney function and blood levels of lithium are monitored in patients being treated with lithium. Therapeutic plasma levels of lithium range from 0.5 to 1.5 mEq/L, with levels of 0.8 or higher being desirable in acute mania.

Lithium levels should be above 0.6 mEq/L to reduce both manic and depressive episodes in patients. A recent review concludes that the standard lithium serum level should be 0.60-0.80 mmol/L with optional reduction to 0.40-0.60 mmol/L in case of good response but poor tolerance or an increase to 0.80-1.00 mmol/L in case of insufficient response and good tolerance.

Monitoring is generally more frequent when lithium is being initiated, and the frequency can be decreased once a patient is stabilized on a given dose. Thyroid hormones should also be monitored periodically, as lithium can increase the risk of hypothyroidism.

Anticonvulsants 

A number of anti-convulsant drugs are used as mood stabilizers, and the suspected mechanism is related to the theory that mania can "kindle" further mania, similar to the kindling model of seizures. Valproic acid, or valproate, was one of the first anti-convulsants tested for use in bipolar disorder. It has proven to be effective for treating acute mania. The mania prevention and antidepressant effects of valproic acid have not been well demonstrated. Valproic acid is less effective than lithium at preventing and treating depressive episodes.

Carbamazepine was the first anti-convulsant shown to be effective for treating bipolar mania. It has not been extensively studied in bipolar depression. It is generally considered a second-line agent due to its side effect profile. Lamotrigine is considered a first-line agent for the treatment of bipolar depression. It is effective in preventing the recurrence of both mania and depression, but it has not proved useful in treating acute mania.

Zonisamide (trade name Zonegran), another anti-convulsant, also may show promise in treating bipolar depression. Various other anti-convulsants have been tested in bipolar disorder, but there is little evidence of their effectiveness. Other anti-convulsants effective in some cases and being studied closer include phenytoin, levetiracetam, pregabalin and valnoctamide.

Each anti-convulsant agent has a unique side-effect profile. Valproic acid can frequently cause sedation or gastrointestinal upset, which can be minimized by giving the related drug divalproex, which is available in an enteric-coated tablet. These side effects tend to disappear over time. According to studies conducted in Finland in patients with epilepsy, valproate may increase testosterone levels in teenage girls and produce polycystic ovary syndrome in women who began taking the medication before age 20. Increased testosterone can lead to polycystic ovary syndrome with irregular or absent menses, obesity, and abnormal growth of hair. Therefore, young female patients taking valproate should be monitored carefully by a physician. Excessive levels of valproate can lead to impaired liver function, and liver enzymes and serum valproate level, with a target of 50–125 µg/L, should be monitored periodically.

Side effects of carbamazepine include blurred vision, double vision, ataxia, weight gain, nausea, and fatigue, as well as some rare but serious side effects such as blood dyscrasias, pancreatitis, exfoliative dermatitis, and hepatic failure. Monitoring of liver enzymes, platelets, and blood cell counts are recommended.

Lamotrigine generally has minimal side effects, but the dose must be increased slowly to avoid rashes, including Stevens-Johnson syndrome (SJS) and exfoliative dermatitis.

Atypical antipsychotic drugs 
Antipsychotics work best in the manic phase of bipolar disorder.
Second-generation or atypical antipsychotics (including aripiprazole, olanzapine, quetiapine, paliperidone, risperidone, and ziprasidone) have emerged as effective mood stabilizers. The evidence for this is fairly recent, as in 2003 the American Psychiatric Press noted that atypical anti-psychotics should be used as adjuncts to other anti-manic drugs because their mood stabilizing properties had not been well established. The mechanism is not well known, but may be related to effects on glutamate activity. Several studies have shown atypical antipsychotics to be effective both as single-agent and adjunctive treatments. Antidepressant effectiveness varies, which may be related to different serotonergic and dopaminergic receptor binding profiles. Quetiapine and the combination of olanzapine and fluoxetine have both demonstrated effectiveness in bipolar depression.

In light of recent evidence, olanzapine (Zyprexa) has been FDA approved as an effective monotherapy for the maintenance of bipolar disorder. A head-to-head randomized control trial in 2005 has also shown olanzapine monotherapy to be just as effective and safe as lithium in prophylaxis.

The atypical antipsychotics differ somewhat in side effect profiles, but most have some risk of sedation, weight gain, and extrapyramidal symptoms (including tremor, stiffness, and restlessness). They may also increase the risk of metabolic syndrome, so metabolic monitoring should be performed regularly, including checks of serum cholesterol, triglycerides, and glucose, weight, blood pressure, and waist circumference. Taking antipsychotics for long periods or at high doses can also cause tardive dyskinesia — a sometimes incurable neurological disorder resulting in involuntary, repetitive body movements. The risk of tardive dyskinesia appears to be lower in second-generation antipsychotics than in first-generation antipsychotics but as with first-generation drugs, increases with time spent on medications and in older patients.

New treatments 
A variety of other agents have been tried in bipolar disorder, including benzodiazepines, calcium channel blockers, L-methylfolate, and thyroid hormone. Modafinil (Provigil) and Pramipexole (Mirapex) have been suggested for treating cognitive dysfunction associated with bipolar depression, but evidence supporting their use is quite limited.  In addition riluzole, a glutamatergic drug used in ALS has been studied as an adjunct or monotherapy treatment in bipolar depression, with mixed and inconsistent results. The selective estrogen receptor modulator medication tamoxifen has shown rapid and robust efficacy treating acute mania in bipolar patients. This action is likely due not to tamoxifen's estrogen-modulating properties, but due to its secondary action as an inhibitor of protein Kinase C.

Cognitive effects of mood stabilizers 
Bipolar patients taking antipsychotics have lower scores on tests of memory and full-scale IQ than patients taking other mood stabilisers. Use of both typical and atypical antipsychotics is associated with risk of cognitive impairment, but the risk is higher for antipsychotics with more sedating effects.

Among bipolar patients taking anticonvulsants, those on lamotrigine have a better cognitive profile than those on carbamazepine, valproate, topiramate, and zonisamide.

Although decreased verbal memory and slowed psychomotor speed are common side effects of lithium use
these side effects usually disappear after discontinuation of lithium. Lithium may be protective of cognitive function in the long term since it promotes neurogenesis in the hippocampus and increases grey matter volume in the prefrontal cortex.

Antidepressants 

Antidepressants are used with caution in bipolar disorder, as they may not be effective and may even induce mania. They are generally not used alone, but may be considered as an adjunct to lithium.

A recent large-scale study found that severe depression in patients with bipolar disorder responds no better to a combination of antidepressant medications and mood stabilizers than it does to mood stabilizers alone and that antidepressant use does not hasten the emergence of manic symptoms in patients with bipolar disorder.

The concurrent use of an antidepressant and a mood stabilizer, instead of mood stabilizer monotherapy, may lower the risk of further bipolar depressive episodes in patients whose most recent depressive episode has been resolved. However, some studies have also found that antidepressants pose a risk of inducing hypomania or mania, sometimes in individuals with no prior history of mania. Saint John's Wort, a naturally occurring compound, is thought to function in a fashion similar to man-made antidepressants, and there are reports that suggest that it can also induce mania. For these reasons, some psychiatrists are hesitant to prescribe antidepressants for the treatment of bipolar disorder unless mood stabilizers have failed to have an effect, however, others feel that antidepressants still have an important role to play in treatment of bipolar disorder.

Side effects vary greatly among different classes of antidepressants.

Antidepressants are helpful in preventing suicides in people with bipolar disorder when they go in for the depressive phase.

NMDA-receptor antagonists 

In a double-blind, placebo-controlled, proof-of-concept study, researchers administered an N-methyl-d-aspartate–receptor antagonist (ketamine) to 18 patients already on treatment with lithium (10 patients) or valproate (8 patients) for bipolar depression. From 40 minutes following intravenous injection of ketamine hydrochloride (0.5 mg/kg), the researchers observed significant improvements in depressive symptoms, as measured by standard tools, that were maintained for up to 3 days, an effect not observed in subjects who received the placebo. Five subjects dropped out of the ketamine study; of these, four were taking valproate and one was being treated with lithium. One patient showed signs of hypomania following ketamine administration and two experienced low mood. This study demonstrates a rapid-onset antidepressant effect of ketamine in a small group of patients with bipolar depression. The authors acknowledged the study's limitations, including the dissociative disturbances in patients receiving ketamine that could have compromised the study blinding, and they emphasised the need for further research.

A more recent double-blind, placebo-controlled study by the same group found that ketamine treatment resulted in a similarly rapid alleviation of suicidal ideation in 15 patients with bipolar depression.

Ketamine is used as a dissociative anaesthetic, and is a Class C substance in the United Kingdom; as such, it is only be used psychiatrically under the direction of a health professional.

Dopamine agonists 
In a single controlled study of twenty one patients, the dopamine D3 receptor agonist pramipexole was found to be highly effective in the treatment of bipolar depression. Treatment was initiated at 0.125 mg t.i.d. and increased at a rate of 0.125 mg t.i.d. to a limit of 4.5 mg qd until the patients' condition satisfactorily responded to the medication or they could not abide the side effects. The final average dosage was 1.7 mg ± .90 mg qd. The incidence of hypomania in the treatment group was no greater than in the control group.

Psychotherapy  

Certain types of psychotherapy, used in combination with medication, may provide some benefit in the treatment of bipolar disorders. Psychoeducation has been shown to be effective in improving patients' compliance with their lithium treatment. Evidence of the efficacy of family therapy is not adequate to support unrestricted recommendation of its use. There is "fair support" for the utility of cognitive therapy. Evidence for the efficacy of other psychotherapies is absent or weak, often not being performed under randomized and controlled conditions. Well-designed studies have found interpersonal and social rhythm therapy to be effective.

Although medication and psychotherapy cannot cure the illness, therapy can often be valuable in helping to address the effects of disruptive manic or depressive episodes that have hurt a patient's career, relationships or self-esteem. Therapy is available not only from psychiatrists but from social workers, psychologists and other licensed counselors.

Jungian therapy 
Jungian authors have likened the mania and depression of bipolar disorder to the Jungian archetypes 'puer' and 'senex'. The puer archetype is defined by the behaviors of spontaneity, impulsiveness, enthusiasm or mania and is symbolized by characters such as Peter Pan or the Greek god Hermes. The senex archetype is defined by behaviors of order, systematic thought, caution, and depression and is symbolized by characters such as the Roman god Saturn or the Greek god Kronos. Jungians conceptualize the puer and senex as a coexistent bipolarity appearing in human behavior and imagination, but in neurotic manifestations appears as extreme oscillations and as unipolar manifestations. In the case of the split puer-senex bipolarity the therapeutic task is to bring the puer and senex back into correlation by working with the patient's mental imagery."

Lifestyle changes

Sufficient sleep 
If sleeping is disturbed, the symptoms can occur. Sleep disruption may actually exacerbate the mental illness state. Those who do not get enough sleep at night, sleep late and wake up late, or go to sleep with some disturbance (e.g. music or charging devices) have a greater chance of having the symptoms and, in addition, depression. It is highly advised by psychiatric authorities to not sleep too late and to get enough high quality sleep.

Self-management and self-awareness 
Understanding the symptoms, when they occur and ways to control them using appropriate medications and psychotherapy generally helps those diagnosed with bipolar disorder to lead a psychologically healthier life. Prodrome symptom detection has been shown to be used effectively to anticipate onset of manic episodes and requires close monitoring of bipolar symptoms. Because the offset of the symptoms is often gradual, even subtle mood changes and activity levels are monitored to help avoid a relapse. Maintaining a mood chart is a specific method used by patients and doctors to identify mood, environmental and activity triggers.

Stress reduction 
Forms of stress may include having too much to do, too much complexity and conflicting demands among others. There are also stresses that come from the absence of elements such as human contact, a sense of achievement, constructive creative outlets, and occasions or circumstances that will naturally elicit positive emotions.
Stress reduction will involve reducing things that cause anxiety and increasing those that generate happiness. It is not enough to just reduce the anxiety.

Co-morbid substance use disorder 
Co-occurring substance misuse disorders, which are extremely common in bipolar patients, can cause a significant worsening of bipolar symptomatology and can cause the emergence of affective symptoms. The treatment options and recommendations for substance use disorders is wide but may include certain pharmacological and nonpharmacological treatment options.

Other treatments

Omega-3 fatty acids 
Omega-3 fatty acids may also be used as a treatment for bipolar disorder, particularly as a supplement to medication. An initial clinical trial by Stoll et al. produced positive results. However, since 1999, attempts to confirm this finding of beneficial effects of omega-3 fatty acids in several larger double-blind clinical trials have produced inconclusive results. It was hypothesized that the therapeutic ingredient in omega-3 fatty acid preparations is eicosapentaenoic acid (EPA) and that supplements should be high in this compound to be beneficial. A 2008 Cochrane systematic review found limited evidence to support the use of Omega-3 fatty acids to improve depression but not mania as an adjunct treatment for bipolar disorder.

Omega-3 fatty acids may be found in fish, fish oils, algae, and to a lesser degree in other foods such as flaxseed, flaxseed oil and walnuts. Although the benefits of Omega-3 fatty acids remain debated, they are readily available at drugstores and supermarkets, relatively inexpensive, and have few known side effects. (All of these oils, however, have the capacity to exacerbate GERD—food sources may be a good alternative in such cases.)

Exercise 
Exercise has also been shown to have antidepressant effects.

Electroconvulsive therapy 

Electroconvulsive therapy (ECT) may have some effectiveness in mixed mania states, and good effectiveness in bipolar depression, particularly in the presence of psychosis. It may also be useful in the treatment of severe mania that is non-responsive to medications.

The most frequent side effects of ECT include memory impairment, headaches, and muscle aches. In some instances, ECT can produce significant and long-lasting cognitive impairment, including anterograde amnesia, and retrograde amnesia.

Ketogenic diet 
Because many of the medications that are effective in treating epilepsy are also effective as mood stabilizers, it has been suggested that the ketogenic diet—used for treating pediatric epilepsy—could have mood stabilizing effects. Ketogenic diets are diets that are high in fat and low in carbohydrates, and force the body to use fat for energy instead of sugars from carbohydrates. This causes a metabolic response similar to that seen in the body during fasting. This idea has not been tested by clinical research, and until recently, was entirely hypothetical. Recently, however, two case studies have been described where ketogenic diets were used to treat bipolar II. In each case, the patients found that the ketogenic diet was more effective for treating their disorder than medication and were able to discontinue the use of medication. The key to efficacy appears to be ketosis, which can be achieved either with a classic high-fat ketogenic diet, or with a low-carbohydrate diet similar to the induction phase of the Atkins Diet.  The mechanism of action is not well understood. It is unclear whether the benefits of the diet produce a lasting improvement in symptoms (as is sometimes the case in treatment for epilepsy) or whether the diet would need to be continued indefinitely to maintain symptom remission.

The role of cannabinoids 

Acute cannabis intoxication transiently produces perceptual distortions, psychotic symptoms and reduction in cognitive abilities in healthy persons and in severe mental disorder, and may impair the ability to safely operate a motor vehicle.

Cannabis use is common in bipolar disorder; and is a risk factor for a more severe course of the disease by increasing frequency and duration of episodes. It is also reported to reduce age at onset.

Alternative medicine 
Several studies have suggested that omega-3 fatty acids may have beneficial effects on depressive symptoms, but not manic symptoms. However, only a few small studies of variable quality have been published and there is not enough evidence to draw any firm conclusions.

See also 
 Self-medication
 International Society for Bipolar Disorders

References

Further reading

External links 

 
 

 
Bipolar disorder